James Bellord (26 February 1846 – 11 June 1905) was an English-born Roman Catholic bishop who served as the Vicar Apostolic of Gibraltar from 1899 to 1905.

Born in London, England on 26 February 1846, he served as a military chaplain. He was appointed the Vicar Apostolic of Gibraltar and Titular Bishop of Milevum by Pope Leo XIII on 16 February 1899. His consecration to the Episcopate took place on 1 May 1899; the principal consecrator was the Right Reverend James Laird Patterson, Auxiliary Bishop of Westminster, with the Right Reverend Robert Brindle, Auxiliary Bishop of Westminster (later Bishop of Nottingham) and the Right Reverend Francis Bourne, Bishop of Southwark (later Cardinal-Archbishop of Westminster), serving as co-consecrators.

Bishop Bellord resigned in 1901 and died at Southend on 11 June 1905, aged 59.

References

1846 births
1905 deaths
19th-century Roman Catholic bishops of Gibraltar
Roman Catholic clergy from London
20th-century Roman Catholic bishops of Gibraltar